Veteran is a hamlet in Ulster County, New York, United States.

References

Hamlets in Ulster County, New York
Hamlets in New York (state)